

History

Early beginnings
The first missionary of the Assemblies of God in the United States of America to work in the Philippines was Benjamin H. Caudle and his wife, who arrived in 1926. However, due to his wife's illness, Caudle was forced to return to the United States.

In the 1930s, Filipinos who had graduated from Assemblies of God Bible schools began requesting that the denomination send an appointed missionary to organize the church there. At the time, the Philippines was an American protectorate. Therefore, legally, the AG needed a missionary appointed by the U.S. body to be registered as a religious organization.

Mission planted
In December 1939, the Assemblies of God USA responded by sending a missionary, Leland E. Johnson, to organize and superintend the Philippines District Council of the Assemblies of God. The first convention was held in March 1940 at Villasis, Pangasinan, and the Council was incorporated on June 19 that same year. Other missionaries would arrive, especially from China, as conflict with Japan escalated. In 1941, the Bethel Bible Institute was opened in Baguio to train pastors and evangelists.

World War II
During World War II, Japanese military forces occupied the Philippines. The Bible institute, like all schools, was closed, and the missionaries were interned. During these years, the district was led entirely by Filipinos.

After the war
After the war, the missionary presence was revived and the Bethel Bible Institute was reopened. Immanuel Bible Institute in Cebu City was founded in 1951, and in 1953, Bethesda Children's Home was founded by Elva Vanderbout, a missionary to the Igorots of the Mountain Province in Northern Luzon. In 1958, it had 12,022 members.

References

External links
 Official website
 
 

Assemblies of God National Fellowships
Evangelicalism in the Philippines
Religious organizations established in 1940
Pentecostal denominations in Asia